Kelvin Mercer (born August 17, 1969), also known by his stage name Posdnuos, Plug 1 and occasionally Pos, is an American rapper and producer from East Massapequa, New York best known for his work as one-third of the hip hop trio De La Soul. Through his work with the group, Mercer is considered to be one of the most consistent and underrated MCs of all time. Beginning with the highly acclaimed 3 Feet High and Rising in 1989, Mercer has gone on to release nine albums with De La Soul.

Cameos and album appearances

Aliases
All three members of De La Soul have used a number of aliases. The following are the most significant:

 Posdnuos – Pronounced "poss-duh-noose". The name may be a combination of the reversed words sop, meaning "gift," and sound, a name Mercer went by while acting as a high school DJ. According to some sources, the fact that the words spelled backward are "sounds op [i.e., operative]" is intentional.
 Plug One – An early concept for 3 Feet High and Rising involved music being transmitted from Mars by three microphone plugs (each one representing a member of the group). Though this idea was abandoned, the titles "Plug One", "Plug Two" and "Plug Three" still became relevant on the album. Mercer's title of Plug One would eventually evolve into Plug Wonder Why, which would be shortened to a synonym of the original, Plug Won.
 Mercenary – Derived from the last name, "Mercer". This name was given to him by DCQ, brother of Mos Def.
 P-Pain – Caricature of the rapper T-Pain. He uses this alias in the song "Supervillainz" by DOOM.

References

1969 births
African-American male rappers
Alternative hip hop musicians
American dance musicians
American hip hop record producers
Grammy Award winners
Living people
Rappers from New York (state)
Rappers from the Bronx
People from Long Island
De La Soul members
21st-century American rappers
Record producers from New York (state)
21st-century American male musicians
21st-century African-American musicians
20th-century African-American people